Hasan Hayri Tan (1880–1942) was a Turkish politician and jurist, who was the lawyer of certain CUP figureheads at the Armenian genocide trials.

References 

1880 births
1942 deaths
Lawyers from Istanbul
20th-century Turkish politicians
Republican People's Party (Turkey) politicians
Politicians from Istanbul